The 1891–92 season was Burslem Port Vale's second successive season in the Midland League. They managed to finish third in the table and were rewarded with a place in the Football League for the following season, justifying the club's decision to refuse to listen to offers for star forward Frank McGinnes. They also reached the semi-finals of the Staffordshire Senior Cup and won the North Staffordshire Challenge Cup, though exited the FA Cup and Birmingham Senior Cup at the first round.

Overview

Midland League
In preparation for the new Midland League campaign, Burslem Port Vale signed winger Jimmy Scarratt from Wellington St. George's and prepared a new kit of red jerseys with grey kickers – the uniforms were made by Mrs Danks, the secretary's wife. They failed to bring good fortune in the opening league game however, a 3–2 defeat at home to Burton Wanderers. After the game the club also signed a new outside-right, G McHarg. Though he had little impact on the first-team, they managed to record a 7–1 victory over Loughborough Town, with Frank McGinnes claiming a hat-trick. They followed this with a 4–0 win over Doncaster Rovers, despite McGinnis missing the first ever penalty shot awarded  at the Athletic Ground and McHarg being criticised for over-dribbling. The team settled into their usual pattern of winning at home but losing away, losing on the road five times whilst winning all but one of their remaining home fixtures. The first run to end was their away form, as they won 2–1 at Loughborough Town and then won their final two away matches. The turn around in away form, coupled with continuing home victories, took the club from ninth (of eleven teams) in January to third by the end of the season. Alarmingly though only 150 spectators turned out to witness the final day victory over Leicester Fosse on 28 April, causing the club to make a loss on the game after marketing costs were deducted. Potteries derby rivals Stoke meanwhile were keen to take McGinnis to the Football League First Division, but Vale resisted all attempts to sign him, rejecting a bid of £30.

Cup competitions
Vale failed to transfer their league form to the FA Cup, bowing out at the first qualification round after losing 4–2 to Burton Wanderers. They entered the Birmingham Senior Cup, but faced tough opposition in Aston Villa in the first round and were beaten 5–2. They fared better in the Staffordshire Senior Cup, avenging Burton Wanderers with a 4–0 victory despite a slow start to the game. In the next round they overcame Walsall Town Swifts after a replay, but fell to a 4–1 defeat to Burton Swifts in the semi-finals. They managed to end the season by taking home the North Staffordshire Challenge Cup outright, beating Stoke 2–0 despite McGinnis being sent off for "foul charging".

Results
Burslem Port Vale's score comes first

Legend

Midland League

FA Cup

Birmingham Senior Cup

Staffordshire Senior Cup

North Staffordshire Challenge Cup

Friendlies

Player statistics

Appearances

Top scorers

Transfers

Transfers in

Transfers out

References
Specific

General

Port Vale F.C. seasons
Burslem Port Vale